In mathematics, the Dieudonné plank is a specific topological space introduced by . It is an example of a metacompact space that is not paracompact.

References

Topology